Iveta Dudová is a Czech former football striker who played for Compex Otrokovice in the Czech First Division. She was a member of the Czech national team for eight years.

References

1977 births
Living people
Czech women's footballers
Czech Republic women's international footballers
People from Uherské Hradiště
Women's association football forwards
1. FC Slovácko (women) players
Czech Women's First League players
Sportspeople from the Zlín Region